KACU is an FM Public radio station that serves the Abilene, Texas, area. The station is owned by Abilene Christian University. KACU is an NPR affiliate station. KACU is the only public radio station in Abilene as well as the only station that broadcasts in high definition. College students make up the on-air staff and news team.

References

External links
KACU official website

ACU
KACU
Texas classical music
Abilene Christian University
ACU
Radio stations established in 1986
1986 establishments in Texas